Kasegan may refer to:
 Kasegan-e Sofla